The 1993 Texas Longhorns baseball team represented the University of Texas at Austin in the 1993 NCAA Division I baseball season. The Longhorns played their home games at Disch–Falk Field. The team was coached by Cliff Gustafson in his 26th season at Texas.

The Longhorns reached the College World Series, where they recorded a win and a loss against Oklahoma State and a loss to eventual runner-up Wichita State.

Personnel

Roster

Coaches

Schedule and results

References

Texas Longhorns baseball seasons
Texas Longhorns
College World Series seasons
Texas Longhorns Baseball